Yolanda Young is a Missouri politician serving as a member of the Missouri House of Representatives from the 22nd district since 2019. She succeeded fellow Democrat Brandon Ellington in the 2019 special election after Ellington was elected to be a member of the Kansas City City Council.

Missouri House of Representatives

Committee assignments 

 Agriculture Policy
 Special Committee on Aging
 Special Committee on Criminal Justice
 Special Committee on Disease Control and Prevention

Electoral history

References

People from Kansas City, Missouri
Democratic Party members of the Missouri House of Representatives
Year of birth missing (living people)
Living people
Women state legislators in Missouri